There were a number of positions open to European nations to qualify for the 2003 Rugby World Cup in Australia. Ireland, Romania, Georgia and Italy, joining a number of other nations that automatically qualified.

Round 1 – 2000–2001
Three Pool Winners and top Runner-Up advanced to Round 2.

Pool A
Winner (Sweden) and Runner-Up (Latvia) advanced to Round 2.

Final Standings

|- bgcolor="C0FFC0"
|
|5||5||0||0||+208||15
|- bgcolor="E0FFE0"
|
|5||4||0||1||+79||13
|-
|  
|5||3||0||2||+78||11
|-
|
|5||2||0||3||+51||9
|- 
|
|5||1||0||4||−222||7
|-
|  
|5||0||0||5||−194||5
|}

Match Schedule

Pool B
Winner (Switzerland) advanced to Round 2.

Final Standings

|- bgcolor="C0FFC0"
|
|5||4||0||1||+166||13
|- 
|
|5||3||0||2||+45||11
|-
|  
|5||3||0||2||+43||11
|-
|
|5||2||0||3||−9||9
|- 
|
|5||2||0||3||−58||9
|-
|  
|5||1||0||4||−187||7
|}

Match Schedule

Pool C
Winner (Belgium) advanced to Round 2.

Final Standings

|- bgcolor="C0FFC0"
|
|5||5||0||0||+71||15
|- 
|
|5||3||1||1||+46||12
|-
|  
|5||3||0||2||+25||11
|-
|
|5||2||1||2||+38||10
|- 
|
|5||1||0||4||−30||7
|-
|  
|5||0||0||5||−150||5
|}

Match Schedule

Round 2 – 2001–2002
Pool Winners advanced to Round 3.

Pool A
Winner (Poland)advanced to Round 3.

Final Standings

|- bgcolor="C0FFC0"
|
|4||4||0||0||+69||12
|- 
|
|4||2||0||2||+24||8
|-
|  
|4||2||0||2||+23||8
|-
|
|4||2||0||2||+19||8
|- 
|
|4||0||0||4||−135||4
|}

Match Schedule

Pool B
Winner (Czech Republic) advanced to Round 3.

Final Standings

|- bgcolor="C0FFC0"
|
|4||4||0||0||+95||12
|- 
|
|4||3||0||1||+46||10
|-
|  
|4||2||0||2||−14||8
|-
|
|4||1||0||3||−40||6
|- 
|
|4||0||0||4||−87||4
|}

Match Schedule

Round 3 – May–June, 2002
Pool Winners advanced to Round 4.

Pool A
Winner (Spain) advanced to Round 4.

Final Standings

|- bgcolor="C0FFC0"
|
|2||1||0||1||+1||4
|-
|  
|2||1||0||1||0||4
|-
|
|2||1||0||1||−1||4
|}

Match Schedule

Pool B
Winner (Russia) advanced to Round 4.

Final Standings

|- bgcolor="C0FFC0"
|
|2||2||0||0||+81||6
|-
|  
|2||1||0||1||+23||4
|-
|
|2||0||0||2||−104||2
|}

Match Schedule

Round 4 – September–October, 2002
Pool Winners and Runners-Up qualified to 2003 Rugby World Cup.  3rd-Place advanced to Round 5.

Pool A
Italy qualified as Europe 2 to Pool D, Romania as Europe 3 to Pool A.  Spain advanced to Round 5.

Final Standings

|-  bgcolor="C0FFC0"
|
|2||2||0||0||+55||6
|- bgcolor="C0FFC0"
|  
|2||1||0||1||+53||4
|- bgcolor="E0FFE0"
|
|2||0||0||2||−108||2
|}

Match Schedule

Pool B
Ireland qualified as Europe 1 to Pool D, Georgia as Europe 4 to Pool C.  Russia advanced to Round 5.

Final Standings

|- bgcolor="C0FFC0"
| 
|2||2||0||0||+81||6
|- bgcolor="C0FFC0"
|  
|2||1||0||1||−45||4
|- bgcolor="E0FFE0"
|
|2||0||0||2||−36||2
|}

Match Schedule

Round 5 – October–November, 2002
Spain advanced to Repechage as Europe 5 to play Africa 2.

Match Schedule

Russia won 58–41 on aggregate.  However, after it was determined they used ineligible South African players, they were ejected from the competition and Spain advanced to Repechage.

Bibliography

References 

2003
European
2000–01 in European rugby union
2001–02 in European rugby union